Once Upon a Time... Happily Never After is a Spanish musical comedy series created by Manolo Caro and produced by Noc Noc Cinema for Netflix. It was released globally on the streaming platform on 11 March 2022, and stars Colombian singer Sebastián Yatra in his acting debut.

Synopsis
Two estranged lovers must find each other in another life and reunite so they can break a spell that prevents an entire town from falling in love, but the arrival of two tourists will endanger their one chance at making it happen.

Cast
 Sebastián Yatra as Diego / Maxi
 Nía Correia as Ana / Juana
 Mónica Maranillo as Soledad / Goya
 Asier Etxeandia as Froilán / Antonio
 Mariana Treviño as Queen Dolores / Lola
 Mariola Fuentes as Queen Fátima / Simona
 Itziar Castro as Eloísa / Candela
 Julián Villagrán as Anselmo / Leo
 Daniela Vega as The Witch / Enamora
 Rossy de Palma as Mamen

Episode list

Critical reception
Upon its release, Once Upon a Time... Happily Never After was met with a negative reception from Spanish critics. Pere Solà Gimferrer of La Vanguardia wrote an "anti-recommendation" review of the show, stating: "It's a crass, absurd comedy that mixes fairytales, prostitution and a wardrobe that seems bought from a costume shop. It would be bold were it not for an unforgivable mistake it makes: being camp without being any fun." Espinof's Mikel Zorrilla also panned the series, pointing out its indecisive tone as its most important flaw: "At times it seems to be going for a more serious, dramatic approach, while in other occasions it dangerously flirts with ridiculousness. This could lead the viewer to despair over what's unfolding before their eyes, since even in the setting work, a certain narrative schizophrenia can be perceived, which dooms Once Upon a Time... Happily Never After to be Netflix's worst Spanish series to date."

Internationally, the series also received negative reviews. Decider's Joel Keller compared the show to American series Galavant, while noting both shows suffered from similar issues: "[Galavant creator Dan] Fogelman tried to cram so much funny into each episode, along with the musical interludes, that the story collapsed under the weight of all the devices he used. That’s the problem with Once Upon A Time... Happily Never After, but with the added device of two timelines and the same actors playing roles in each." He concluded the review by advising readers to skip the series: "There are better examples of musical comedy series out there (Zoey's Extraordinary Playlist, anyone?); there’s just too much going on in Once Upon A Time... Happily Never After to recommend it."

References

External links

Fantasy comedy television series
Spanish musical television series
Spanish-language Netflix original programming
2020s Spanish television series
2022 Spanish television series debuts